Richard Bracken (August 3, 1930 – February 11, 2021) was an American film editor. He was nominated for four Primetime Emmy Awards in the category Outstanding Picture Editing for his work on the television programs The Bold Ones: The Lawyers, Rich Man, Poor Man, Buffalo Girls and the television film A Case of Rape. Bracken died in February 2021 of kidney failure in Chatsworth, California, at the age of 90.

References

External links 

1930 births
2021 deaths
People from Philadelphia
Deaths from kidney failure
American film editors
American television editors
University of Michigan alumni